The Laos national beach soccer team represents Laos in international beach soccer competitions and is controlled by the Lao Football Federation, the governing body for football in Laos.

Current squad

Achievements

AFF Beach Soccer Championship

AFC Beach Soccer Championship

See also
 2014 AFF Beach Soccer Championship
 2015 AFC Beach Soccer Championship

References

http://www.aseanfootball.org/results/AFF-FELDA_BEACH_SOCCER_CHAMPIONSHIP2014-MatchSummary-004.pdf Retrieved 2015-04-19.

External links

Asian national beach soccer teams
National sports teams of Laos